Agia Eirini Gorge (Greek Φαράγγι Αγίας Ειρήνης), sometimes called St. Irene Gorge, is located in the south-west of the island of Crete, Greece, in Lefka Ori. The gorge starts near the village of Agia Eirini and it ends near the village of Sougia, on the south coast. In 1866, 1,000 women and children escaped from the Ottomans through this gorge.

References

Gorges of Crete
Landforms of Chania (regional unit)